The Hirth F-33 is a single cylinder, two stroke, carburetted aircraft engine designed for use on ultralight aircraft, including powered paragliders and ultralight trikes. the engine is noted for its extremely light base weight of . It is manufactured by Hirth of Germany.

Development
The F-33 was intended to fill the niche previously occupied by the now out-of-production  Rotax 277. The F-33 uses free air cooling, dual capacitor discharge ignition and reed valve induction, with a single Bing 34mm slide or optional diaphragm type carburetor. The cylinder walls are electrochemically coated with Nikasil. Standard starting is recoil start. A belt reduction drive system, fuel injection, tuned exhaust and electric start are optional.

The engine runs on a 50:1 pre-mix of unleaded 93 octane auto fuel and oil. Recommended time between overhauls is 1000 hours.

Applications

Specifications (F-33)

References

External links

Hirth aircraft engines
Air-cooled aircraft piston engines
Two-stroke aircraft piston engines